Zinc finger Ran-binding domain-containing protein 2 is a protein that in humans is encoded by the ZRANB2 gene.

Interactions 

ZRANB2 has been shown to interact with U2 small nuclear RNA auxiliary factor 1 and SNRP70.

References

Further reading

External links